Notiosoricini, whose members are known as the North American gray shrews, is a tribe of shrews in the family Soricidae, including the genera Megasorex and Notiosorex. They are found across the southwestern United States and most of Mexico.

The tribe includes the following species:

 Genus Megasorex
 Mexican shrew, M. gigas
 Genus Notiosorex
 Cockrum's gray shrew, N. cockrumi
 Crawford's gray shrew, N. crawfordi
 Large-eared gray shrew, N. evotis
 Villa's gray shrew, N. villai

References 

 https://animaldiversity.org/accounts/Notiosoricini/classification/
 http://www.departments.bucknell.edu/biology/resources/msw3/browse.asp?id=13700443
 https://www.itis.gov/servlet/SingleRpt/SingleRpt?search_topic=TSN&search_value=709679#null

Red-toothed shrews
Mammals of North America
Mammal tribes